Tidan is a river in Sweden. It is one of few Swedish rivers that flow north.

References

Rivers of Västra Götaland County